The mass media in Tunisia is an economic sector. Under the authoritarian regimes of Habib Bourguiba, and then Zine el-Abidine Ben Ali, it saw periods of liberalization and then challenges, notably due to Tunisian censorship. The 2010-2011 Tunisian protests and the subsequent change in government may bring significant change in this domain.

In 2007, the Tunisian government's Website counted 245 daily newspapers and reviews, grown from 91 in 1987. These are in large part (90%) owned by private groups and individuals, with much of the press dominated by discussion of government matters. On April 29, 2011, the Minister of the Interior announced authorization was granted to 51 new newspapers and reviews published since the beginning of the revolution.

History 

The first daily newspaper printed in Tunisia appeared on July 22, 1860 under the name Arra'id Attunisi, calling itself "The official journal of the Tunisian Republic", founded by the ruler of that period, Sadok Bey. The anti-Arab attacks by the Colonial Party and its Editor in Chief, Victor de Carnières, pushed Tunisian intellectuals to launch Le Tunisien in 1907, the first newspaper in the French language in Tunisia, with the aim of influencing the authorities of the Protectorate of Tunisia and French public opinion.

Starting from that date, the number of French-language titles grew to reach 41 in 1956, while the Arab-language press counted 288 titles by that year. At the beginning of 1991, there were six French language dailies, and nine in Arabic; there were 140 weeklies — 45 in French — and 160 monthly publications.

Tunisian political parties had the right to publish their own newspapers but those of the political opposition were only published intermittently. Faced with this situation, in 1991 the government issued a grant of 30,000 Tunisian dinars to each of the parties. Other assistance was also provided to cover other expenses (paper, postage, and so on), but appeared to be granted under unclear criteria. In a decree amending the law in 1999 relating to public financing of political parties, the government allocated a grant of 120,000 dinars to political party publications and 30,000 dinars to other periodicals. These mechanisms constituted a pressure tactic that the government could use on newspapers that expressed too much criticism of the regime.

Legislation 

The Code de la presse de 1975 was revised on August 2, 1988, on July 23, 1993, and on May 3, 2001. It notably banned publications that disturbed public order or "defamed" the authorities, even if the allegations had been proven. The crime of "defaming public order" was removed from legislation, as was the administrative formality of preemptive filing of newspapers with the Minister of the Interior before publication, on May 27, 2005.

Freedom of the press is guaranteed by the Constitution of Tunisia, although in practice, it has been usual for publications to follow the government line without a critical perspective, and to report the activities of the president, the government and the ruling party, based on dispatches issued by the government Tunis Afrique Presse. This agency has in the past examined some of the subjects "not to the liking of the government." A report by the UN Human Rights Committee in 2000 showed that despite the 188 titles in the Tunisian press, it was marked by its "uniformity of tone".  This was recognized by the President Zine el-Abidine Ben Ali and Prime Minister Hamed Karoui without introducing significant change. According to Lise Garon, the press followed "an imperious demand to show a smooth image to the outside world", resulting in a kind of "internal unanimity".

All newspapers and magazines, comprising opposition publications, can benefit from advertising revenue, whether public or private enterprise. However, La Presse de Tunisie, owned by a public company (Société nouvelle d'impression, de presse et d'édition), has held a virtual monopoly, including with respect to Arab-language publications.

Print media

General publications

News magazines

Magazines on economic affairs

Political press

Niche publications 
Archives de l'Institut Pasteur de Tunis
Archives des Instituts Pasteur de l'Afrique du Nord
Les Cahiers de Tunisie
Revue tunisienne de géographie
Revue tunisienne de sciences sociales
La Tunisie médicale
Il Corriere di Tunisi

Defunct publications 
Le Tunisien (1907–1912)
Ennasnés
La Dépêche tunisienne
L'Action tunisienne / El Amal (1932–1988)
Erraï (1977–1987)
Le Renouveau / Al Horria (1988–2011)
L'Observateur / El Moulahedh (1993–2011)
L'Audace (1994–2001)
L'Expression (2007–2009)
Tunis-Socialiste (1921-?)

Plagiarism 
The institutional Tunisian press is frequently accused by large international newspapers of plagiarism. There have been incidents where print publications have been found to have translated and published material taken from blogs and other online authors, without seeking permission.

Radio and television
Audiovisual media has long been under the domination of the Établissement de la Radiodiffusion-Télévision Tunisienne (ERTT) and its predecessor,  Radiodiffusion-télévision tunisienne, founded in 1957. The President of Tunisia, Zine el-Abidine Ben Ali announced on November 7, 2006 the splitting up of the organization on August 31, 2007 into separate entities that would oversee Tunisian television broadcasting and Tunisian radio broadcasting.

Television

The Établissement de la Télévision Tunisienne manages the public television stations (Watanya 1 and Watanya 2 which replaced the defunct RTT 2). Since government policy changes in 2003, the television industry has been opened up to the private sector. This resulted in two new channels on Tunisian television: Hannibal TV, Nessma and Nessma EU, and after the Tunisian Revolution several new private channels founded as El-Hiwar Ettounsy, Tunisna, TWT, TT1, Zitouna, Alinsen, Aljanoubia, TNN Tunisia News Network, Tsport, AlQalam, AlMutawasit and Elhiwar Ettounsi.

Television in Tunisia reaches 94% of households. The dominant platform in the market is free satellite, though terrestrial platform reaches around 15% of the households.

Radio

The Établissement de la Radio Tunisienne manages four national public radio stations: (Radio Tunis, Radio Tunisie Culture, Radio Jeunes and RTCI).  It also manages five regional stations: Sfax, Monastir, Gafsa, Tataouine and Le Kef.

The majority of radio broadcasts are in Arabic, but some are in French. In 2003, a process of opening the radio industry to the private sector began. Since then, private radio stations have started broadcasting in Tunisia: Mosaïque FM, Jawhara FM, Zitouna FM, Shems FM and Express FM and after the Tunisian Revolution several new private stations founded as Mines FM (Sawt Elmanajem), Kalima FM and Oasis FM.

See also

 Internet in Tunisia
 Telecommunications in Tunisia
 Cinema of Tunisia

References

Bibliography
 

 
Tunisia
Tunisia